Stelis choerorhyncha is a species of orchid plant native to Colombia.

References 

choerorhyncha
Flora of Colombia